Coddington is a civil parish in the unitary authority of Cheshire West and Chester and the ceremonial county of Cheshire, England.

See also

Listed buildings in Coddington, Cheshire
St Mary's Church, Coddington

References

External links
Coddington & District community website

Villages in Cheshire
Civil parishes in Cheshire